Jassic (Yassic) can refer to:

 Jassic people 
 Jassic language 

Language and nationality disambiguation pages